Andres Jesús Villena Rodríguez (born 27 February 1993) is a Spanish professional volleyball player. He is a member of the Spain national team. At the professional club level, he plays for Zamalek SC, and the Uijeongbu KB Insurance Stars.

Honours

Clubs
 National championships
 2010/2011  Spanish SuperCup, with Unicaja Almería
 2011/2012  Spanish SuperCup, with Unicaja Almería
 2012/2013  Spanish Championship, with Unicaja Almería
 2015/2016  Spanish SuperCup, with Unicaja Almería
 2015/2016  Spanish Cup, with Unicaja Almería
 2015/2016  Spanish Championship, with Unicaja Almería
 2016/2017  Spanish Cup, with Urbia Voley Palma
 2016/2017  Spanish Championship, with Urbia Voley Palma
 2017/2018  Spanish Cup, with CV Teruel
 2017/2018  Spanish Championship, with CV Teruel
 2018/2019  Spanish SuperCup, with CV Teruel
 2018/2019  Spanish Championship, with CV Teruel
 2019/2020  KOVO Cup, with Incheon Korean Air Jumbos

Youth national team
 2011  FIVB U19 World Championship
 2012  CEV U20 European Championship

Individual awards
 2011: CEV U19 European Championship – Best Server
 2011: FIVB U19 World Championship – Best Scorer
 2012: CEV U20 European Championship – Best Scorer
 2012: CEV U20 European Championship – Best Spiker
 2018: Spanish SuperCup – Most Valuable Player
 2020: KOVO Cup – Most Valuable Player

References

External links

 
 Player profile at LegaVolley.it 
 Player profile at Volleybox.net 

1993 births
Living people
Sportspeople from San Roque, Cádiz
Spanish men's volleyball players
Mediterranean Games medalists in volleyball
Competitors at the 2018 Mediterranean Games
Mediterranean Games silver medalists for Spain
Spanish expatriate sportspeople in Italy
Expatriate volleyball players in Italy
Spanish expatriate sportspeople in France
Expatriate volleyball players in France
Spanish expatriate sportspeople in South Korea
Expatriate volleyball players in South Korea
Spanish expatriate sportspeople in Egypt
Opposite hitters